Shiy De-jinn 席德進 (1923–1981; pinyin: Xi Dejin) was a Chinese modernist artist who became prominent in Taiwan. Born in Sichuan, he was a student of Lin Fengmian and Pang Xunqin. Fleeing the CCP to Taiwan, he lived there until his death. He has attracted interested as a nativist and, especially posthumosuly, as a queer artist.

His works are held at Museum of Contemporary Art Taipei and the Taipei Fine Arts Museum.

References

1923 births
1981 deaths
Taiwanese artists